Neoxeniades is a genus of skippers in the family Hesperiidae.

Species
Recognised species in the genus Neoxeniades include:
Neoxeniades anchicayensis Steinhauser, 2007
Neoxeniades bajula (Schaus, 1902)
Neoxeniades sp. Burns04 
Neoxeniades braesia (Hewitson, 1867)
Neoxeniades cincia (Hewitson, 1867)
Neoxeniades ethoda (Hewitson, [1866])
Neoxeniades gabina (Godman, 1900)
Neoxeniades luda (Hewitson, 1877)
Neoxeniades molion (Godman, [1901])
Neoxeniades musarion Hayward, 1938
Neoxeniades myra Evans, 1955
Neoxeniades parna (Evans, 1955)
Neoxeniades pluviasilva Burns, 2007
Neoxeniades scipio (Fabricius, 1793)
Neoxeniades tropa Evans, 1955
Neoxeniades turmada (Druce, 1912) - Ecuador

References

 , 2007: Four new species of neotropical skippers from Colombia, Peru and Brazil (Lepidoptera: Hesperiidae). Bulletin of the Allyn Museum 147: 1-11.

External links
Natural History Museum Lepidoptera genus database

Hesperiinae
Hesperiidae genera